Synsiä is a medium-sized lake in Southern Savonia, Finland.  The lake is quite shallow. It is located in Kangasniemi municipality near the Finnish National Road 13. From the road there is a nice scenery to the lake and the farms around it.

See also
List of lakes in Finland

References

Lakes of Kangasniemi